Nigro is a surname of Italian origin, meaning black. Notable people with the surname include:
Carmine Nigro (1910–2001), American chess master and instructor; first coach of Bobby Fischer
Dan Nigro (born 1982), American songwriter and producer
Daniel A. Nigro (born 1948), 33rd New York City Fire Commissioner
Don Nigro (born 1949), American playwright
Fabio Nigro (born 1965), Argentine association football player
Filippo Nigro (born 1970), Italian actor
Jan Nigro (1920–2012), New Zealand artist
Laura Nyro (1947–1997), American singer/songwriter
Louis J. Nigro Jr. (1947–2013), American diplomat and ambassador
Pierre Nigro (born 1955), Italian singer better known as Michael Fortunati
Russell M. Nigro (contemporary), American politician from Pennsylvania; former justice of the Supreme Court of Pennsylvania
Stefan Nigro (born 1996), Australian footballer

See also 
Negro
Nigris